Bangladesh Football Federation (Bānglādesh fūṭbôl fēḍārēshôn) is the governing body that administrates the sport of association football in Bangladesh. It is in charge of running the country's men's and women's national teams, as well as the Bangladesh Premier League and various other competitions and tournaments. The BFF was one of founding members of the South Asian Football Federation. It is based at BFF Bhaban, in the Motijheel Thana of the country's capital, Dhaka.

History
The Bangladesh Football Federation was founded on 15 July 1972 by Md. Yousuf Ali, the country's former Minister for Education, Culture and Sport; the general secretary under Ali was Abul Hashem of Wari Club.

It became affiliated with the Asian Football Confederation (AFC) in 1973, and FIFA in 1976. It is also a founding member of South Asian Football Federation. Bangladesh has been elected to be part of the AFC Executive Committee for two four-year terms: in 1982–1986 and 1998–2002. Hafizuddin Ahmed was elected vice-president of the AFC for the term from 1990 to 1994.

After Bangladesh gained independence in the early 1970s, the BFF assumed responsibility for the Dhaka League, which had begun in 1948. The league resumed for the 1973 season, but has since been superseded by the Bangladesh Premier League (founded in 2007 as the B.League) and the Bangladesh Championship League (in 2012), and now exists only as a regional league at the third tier of the nation's football league pyramid.

In 1980, the Federation started the Federation Cup, which grew to be the country's top national cup competition.

In 2009, it launched the Super Cup tournament, which ran in 2009, 2011 and 2013. In 2013, the prize money for winning the competition was Tk10 million. In the inaugural competition, Dhaka Mohammedan SC beat arch-rivals Dhaka Abahani SC.

Executive committee

Board of directors

Competitions

Active

Competitions currently run by BFF include:

Defunct

Competitions previously run by BFF include:

Stadiums

 Bangabandhu National Stadium, Dhaka
 BSSS Mostafa Kamal Stadium, Dhaka
 MA Aziz Stadium, Chittagong
 Sylhet District Stadium, Sylhet
Shamsul Huda Stadium' Jessore
 Rajshahi District Stadium, Rajshahi
 Shaheed Kamruzzaman Stadium, Rajshahi
 Sheikh Fazlul Haque Mani Stadium, Gopalgonj
 Shaheed Salam Stadium, Feni
Mymensingh Stadium, Mymensingh
Shaheed Dhirendranath Stadium, Comilla
Shaheed Bulu Stadium, Noakhali
Sheikh Kamal Stadium, Nilphamari
Bangladesh Army Stadium, Dhaka
Munshigonj Stadium, Munshiganj
Shaheed Ahsan Ullah Master Stadium, Gazipur

Official partners
Nitol-Tata the sole distributor of Tata vehicles in Bangladesh was the official sponsor between 2000 till 2005.

In April 2008, the BFF secured BDT 16,00,00,000 (equivalent to US$22,85,714 appx) for three years from a multinational mobile operator company, Citycell (Pacific Bangladesh Telecom Limited) for three years as sponsorship for Bangladesh Football Federation, which is a record in the football sponsorship money securing in the history of Bangladesh football.

Later in 2010, it made contract with Grameenphone - country's leading mobile phone operator, for the sponsorship of BFF's tournaments.

BFF secured US$70,000 for one year when Nitol-Tata again became the official sponsor for the 2013–14 season.

On 13 March 2022, Pusti became the beverage partner of Bangladesh Football Federation following a two-year agreement.

See also
Bangladesh national football team
Bangladesh women's national football team
List of Bangladeshi football champions
Football in Bangladesh

References

External links
Bangladesh Football Federation (official website)
Bangladesh Football Federation on YouTube
Bangladesh on FIFA.com (archived)
Bangladesh at AFC site (archived)

Football in Bangladesh
1972 establishments in Bangladesh
Bangladesh
Sports organizations established in 1972
Football